Jomoro Municipal District (a.k.a. Nzema West Municipal District) is one of the fourteen districts in Western Region, Ghana. Originally created as an ordinary district assembly in 1988 when it was known as Jomoro District, which was created from the former Nzema District Council, until it was later elevated to municipal district assembly status on 15 March 2018 to become Jomoro Municipal District. The municipality is located in the southwest part of Western Region and has Half Assini as its capital town.

Geography
Jomoro Municipal District is the most westernmost district on the coast of Ghana.

Sources
 Jomoro District Official Website
 
 GhanaDistricts.com

References

Districts of the Western Region (Ghana)